"Fly with Me" is the second single by American pop rock band Jonas Brothers from their fourth studio album Lines, Vines and Trying Times. It was released on June 9, 2009, through Hollywood Records. The song was introduced in the closing credits of the 2009 film Night at the Museum: Battle of the Smithsonian, in which the Brothers provided voiceover work. It was written by the group and their bassist, Greg Garbowsky, about Kevin and Danielle Jonas' relationship before marriage, despite both of them being far apart from each other. A Cantonese version of the song is played in the Flights of Fantasy Parade at Hong Kong Disneyland; an orchestrated instrumental arrangement of the song plays in the Festival of Fantasy Parade at Magic Kingdom at Walt Disney World.

Music video
The music video premiered on the Disney Channel on June 7, 2009, and was uploaded to Hollywood Records' YouTube account on the same night. It features footage of the group rehearsing the song with backstage "behind-the-scenes" video clips of their 2009 World Tour preparation and rehearsals.

Track listing
German and UK CD single
"Fly with Me" – 3:54
"That's Just the Way We Roll" (Live from The 3D Concert Experience) – 4:08
"S.O.S." (ITunes Live from Soho) – 2:31
"A Little Bit Longer" (ITunes Live from Soho) – 5:47

UK enhanced CD single
"Fly with Me" – 3:30
"Fly with Me" (video) – 3:30
"Paranoid" (video)  – 3:47

Charts
The song debuted on the Billboard Hot 100 at number 83 and fell off the chart the next week.

Release history

References

2009 singles
Jonas Brothers songs
Songs written by Kevin Jonas
Songs written by Joe Jonas
Songs written by Nick Jonas
Hollywood Records singles
Songs written by Greg Garbowsky
2009 songs
Song recordings produced by John Fields (record producer)